On 26 November 2008, the European Commission proposed a  European stimulus plan (also referred to as the European Economic Recovery Plan) amounting to 200 billion euros to cope with the effects of the global financial crisis on the economies of the members countries. It aims at limiting the economic slowdown of the economies through national economic policies, with measures extended over a period of two years.

Presentation of the plan
The European Commission presented on 26 November a plan to cope with the current economic crisis in the 27 member countries of the Union.

The plan combines short-term measures to stimulate demand and maintain jobs and longer-term measures to invest in strategical sectors, including research and innovation. The aim is to promote growth and ensure sustainable prosperity.

The plan includes targeted and temporary measures amounting to 200 billion euros, or 1.5% of EU GDP, using both the national budgets of the national governments, the budget of the EU and that of the European Investment Bank. The plan is scheduled on a period of two years.

Measures
The plan includes a broad range of actions at the national level and at EU level to help households and industrial firms (particularly automobile and construction).

The measures include:
 reflation: the Commission will allow Member States to break the Stability and Growth Pact for two or three years.
 incentives to investment: the plan outlines measures to encourage the fight against climate change and promotes strategic investments in buildings and energy-efficient technologies.
 lower rates: the ECB is invited to drop its rates.
 tax rebates: lowering taxation on green technology and eco-friendly cars, accompanied by scrappage programs
 social measures: the Commission proposed the governments to temporarily increase unemployment benefits and their duration, to increase allowances to households, to lower taxes on low incomes, to lower social security contributions paid on low wages by employers, to reduce labour costs paid by employees with low incomes, to provide subsidized loans or credit guarantees for companies, to reduce temporarily the VAT rate to support consumption. The Commission announced it would adopt by mid-March 2009 a proposal to lower VAT rates for services with high labour-intensiveness (such as catering).

National plans
National plans are often close to 1.2 percentage points of GDP, as recommended by the European Commission, and are focused on 2008 and 2009. However, Germany and Spain have announced fiscal stimulus of respectively 3.3% (two plans altogether) and 8.1% of their GDP.

The plan announced by the European Commission at the end of November recommended measures to revive the economy but did not specify much the nature of the plans. Some plans are focused on the stimulation of demand (United Kingdom, to a lesser extent Spain, Italy or the second German plan), other plans insist more in incentives to supply (French plan, first German plan ).

Measures took on expenditure to improve demand generally include measures to support medium-term growth
through increased public spending on infrastructures (road networks and railway) and aids to the housing sector (notably construction and renovation). Several countries have also announced short-term measures to relieve the effects of the crisis on the poorest people (increase in benefits and allowances to households with low incomes and unemployed). However, these aids have often limited effects on the economy, because their amounts are insignificant.

Other measures affected national taxation systems. The UK was the only country that opted for a temporary decline in the standard VAT rate, by 2.5 percentage points. In Germany, employer contributions were lowered. Most plans include incentive measures to SMEs and development of green energy.

References

External links
 European Commission website

Great Recession in Europe
European Union economic policy
European Union Stimulus Plan, 2008
Policy and political reactions to the Eurozone crisis